Zakaria Islam (born 14 February 2002) is a Bangladeshi cricketer. He made his Twenty20 debut for Abahani Limited in the 2018–19 Dhaka Premier Division Twenty20 Cricket League on 27 February 2019.

References

External links
 

2002 births
Living people
Bangladeshi cricketers
Abahani Limited cricketers
Place of birth missing (living people)